United Nations Security Council resolution 638, adopted unanimously on 31 July 1989, after reaffirming resolutions 579 (1985) and 618 (1988), the Council expressed its deep concern at the prevalence in incidents of hostage-taking having grave consequences for the international community and relations between states.

The Council recalled various General Assembly and other resolutions, condemning all incidents of hostage-taking and abductions and calling for the immediate safe release of hostages wherever they are. It also called on States to use their political influence, in accordance with the United Nations Charter, to secure the safe release of hostages and abducted persons.

The resolution also asked Member States not party to the International Convention Against the Taking of Hostages to become party to it and other treaties. Finally, the Council urged greater cooperation in devising and adopting effective measures in accordance with international law to facilitate the prosecution, prevention and punishment of all acts of hostage taking as "manifestations of international terrorism".

See also
 List of hostage crises
 List of United Nations Security Council Resolutions 601 to 700 (1987–1991)

References
Text of the Resolution at undocs.org

External links
 

 0638
Hostage taking
 0638
July 1989 events